The Basilica Fulvia was a basilica built in ancient Rome.  According to Livy (40.51),  the censors M. Aemilius Lepidus and M. Fulvius Nobilior (after whom it was named) had it built in 179 BC.  It may be that there had been a previous building existing on the site from 210 BC which was incorporated (Plaut. Capt. 815, Curc. 472).   In 78 BC, the consul M. Aemilius Lepidus incorporated the building into the Basilica Aemilia (Plin. Nat. Hist. 35.13), and it was renamed the Basilica Fulvia et Aemilia or sometimes simply the Basilica.

Remains 

The Basilica Aemilia was first built in 179 BC  by the censors M. Aemilius Lepidus and M. Fulvius Nobilior. In the following centuries it was actively maintained and improved by the Aemilia gens. The first complete reconstruction took place in the years between 55 BC  and 34 BC, which incorporated into the building the series of shops, the tabernae novae, that stood in front of the basilica. The building was destroyed by a fire in 14 BC and was rebuilt by Augustus. A last restoration happened after a fire in AD 410, following the sacking of the town by the Visigoths of Alaric.

See also
 List of Roman basilicas

References

Fulvia